Bougie is the city of Béjaïa, Algeria.

Bougie may also refer to:

People with the surname Bougie
 Jacques Bougie (born 1947), Manager and CEO of Alcan (1979–2000), mentioned in relation to 1981 Manitoba general election
 Jean Bougie (born 1886), Canadian ice hockey player
 Louis-Pierre Bougie (1946–2021), Canadian painter and engraver

Other uses
 Bougie (medical instrument), a medical instrument used in esophageal dilatation
 Slang for bourgeoisie, a wealthy social class
 "Bougie", a song by Lil Durk from the album Love Songs 4 the Streets 2
bougie, French word for candle

See also 
 Bougy (disambiguation)
 Bogie (disambiguation)
 Boogie (disambiguation)
 Buggie (disambiguation)

American slang
French-language surnames